Regional Rail, LLC is a company operating short-line railroads in Delaware, Florida, New York, and Pennsylvania. It operates 7 railroads: East Penn Railroad, Florida Central Railroad, Florida Midland Railroad, Florida Northern Railroad, Middletown and New Jersey Railroad, Tyburn Railroad and Great Sandhills Railway, as well as the Conshohocken Recycling & Rail Transfer. It is based in Kennett Square, Pennsylvania.

Operations
Regional Rail, LLC owns three railroads in the Mid-Atlantic states of the United States. The Middletown and New Jersey Railroad operates  of railroad lines near Middletown in New York. The Tyburn Railroad serves a transload facility in Morrisville, Bucks County, Pennsylvania. Regional Rail, LLC also owns the Conshohocken Recycling & Rail Transfer in Conshohocken, Pennsylvania, a waste transfer station that ships waste to landfills by rail.

The company additionally owns three railroads in Florida. The Florida Midland Railroad operates 2 lines totaling  in central Florida near Winter Haven and South Lake Wales. The Florida Northern Railroad operates 2 lines totaling  in northern Florida.

The company also owns Diamondback Signal, which installs and maintains grade crossing signals for short line and regional railroads.

In November 2022, G3 Canada sold Great Sandhills Railway to Regional Rail.

History
Regional Rail, LLC was formed in April 2007. Four months later, it took over the East Penn Railroad. In April 2009, the company acquired the Middletown and New Jersey Railroad. In September 2011, Regional Rail, LLC took over the Tyburn Railroad. In June 2012, Regional Rail, LLC took over the Conshohocken Recycling & Rail Transfer. Two months later, the company gained majority ownership of Diamondback Signal, LLC. In August 2015, private equity group Levine Leichtman Capital Partners purchased Regional Rail, with the intention to continue its operations. In 2019, Levine Leichtman Capital Partners sold Regional Rail to 3i RR Holdings GP, LLC, the US rail subsidiary of the private equity firm based in the United Kingdom.

In November 2019, Regional Rail purchased the Florida Central Railroad, Florida Midland Railroad and Florida Northern Railroad from Pinsly Railroad Company.

References

External links
Regional Rail, LLC

United States railroad holding companies
Companies based in Chester County, Pennsylvania
American companies established in 2007
2007 establishments in Pennsylvania